Repsol S.A. is a Spanish multinational energy and petrochemical company based in Madrid. It is engaged in worldwide upstream and downstream activities. In the 2022 Forbes Global 2000, Repsol was ranked as the 320th-largest public company in the world. As of 2022, it has 24,000 employees worldwide.

It is vertically integrated and operates in all areas of the oil and gas industry, including exploration and production, refining, distribution and marketing, petrochemicals, power generation and trading. The business strategy also includes a renewable energy division.

History

CAMPSA and REPESA
In 1927, CAMPSA (Compañía Arrendataria del Monopolio de Petróleos S.A.), headed by Miguel Primo de Rivera y Orbaneja, was created with the objective of administering concessions in handing over the state monopoly of petroleum companies. Originally the company was arranged so that the state would have a minority stake. The Creation of CAMPSA intensified the progress of the Spanish refinery industry.

In 1941, the Spanish government under Francisco Franco created the INI (National Industry Institute), in order to finance and promote Spanish industries. The INI supported CAMPSA in its exploration of Tudanca, Cantabria, a monumental moment in Spanish exploration on the Iberian Peninsula.  The year 1947, marked the end of a 20-year contract between the Spanish state and CAMPSA, decentralizing services while at the same time giving specific rights to the state to intervene in the company's affairs, minus distribution and commercialization, which remained exclusive to CAMPSA.

In 1948, REPESA (Refinería de Petróleos de Escombreras S.A.) was incorporated for the installation of a refinery in the Valley of Escombreras (Cartagena).

REPESA became the symbol of the increasing industrial consolidation in the refining sector, as it took on the production and marketing of petrol, oils and lubricants under its own brand name.'  From the beginning, REPSOL was REPESA's "star brand" of petroleum as a REPESA product brand.

International expansion

In 1999, Repsol bought 97.81% of the Argentine oil and gas company YPF S.A., which at the time was the largest oil-and-gas company in Ibero America. The acquisition better positioned Repsol as a multinational company. Repsol's acquisition of YPF also increased its capital to 288 million shares worldwide. Repsol's presence in Latin America was one of the keys to corporate growth. It was the first full year after the acquisition of YPF and the consolidation of Gas Natural SDG by global integration. The company's business structure was more balanced and international. Then in December 2001, Repsol completed an asset exchange agreement with Petrobras, making it the second largest consolidated oil company in Brazil. The same year Repsol announced new discoveries in Libya, Indonesia, Spain, Venezuela, Argentina, and Bolivia, prompting the development and marketing of its electricity business through Gas Natural SDG. In 2003, Repsol tripled its reserves and production of hydrocarbons in Trinidad and Tobago. North American expansion in 2008, saw Repsol open a massive regasification plant on the east coast of Canada with enough capacity to supply up to 20% of the gas demand for New York and New England.

Canary Islands
Following years of opposition from environmentalist groups, Spain finally gave permission in August 2014, for the company and its partners to explore prospects off the Canary Islands. Eventually, in January 2015, after two months of exploration about 50 kilometers off the coasts of Fuerteventura and Lanzarote, the company said in a statement it only found small deposits that were not worth drilling thus scrapping the project.

Change to the company profile
In 2008, Repsol began an intensive exploration campaign in which it focused its efforts on and invested in exploring in new areas, with results that enabled the company to change its profile. Using cutting edge technology, the company made over 30 hydrocarbon discoveries, many of which were considered to be among the largest in the world.
This efforts was recognized by Petroleum Economist magazine as the "Best energy company of the year".

Talisman acquisition
In December 2014, Repsol announced that it would buy Canadian oil company Talisman Energy in a transaction worth about $15.1 billion Cdn ($13 billion US).

Company name and origins
In 1971, Repsol logo first appears, as REPESA (Refinería de Petróleos de Escombreras S.A.) brand product, in the Motorcycling World Championship of that year.

Its name derives from the founding company REPESA for its visibility and easy pronunciation in different languages. In 1991, the Instituto Nacional de Hidrocarburos (INH), before the imminent demise of the state oil monopoly, set the goal to create a company of mixed public-private capital, which exploited state oil assets. When looking for a name a survey at street level was performed and the only two words that people recognized and associate with the world of oil were CAMPSA (badge of the former monopoly) and REPSOL; obviously, this last one was chosen to name the new company.

"A short, round, sonorous and catchy name was searched. As many terms of the language sink their roots in Latin, here the first letters of a small company of lubricants (Repesa) were used, and the term is completed with the star that identifies Spain in the cultures of the north. Repsol is one of the few names of companies which does not obey an acronym or joins that obsession of putting together letters of horrific names. And that was the first hit".

Business areas

Upstream
Exploration and production of oil and natural gas are in charge of Repsol Exploration SA and its many subsidiaries. It is present in several countries, such as Spain, United States, Canada, Brazil, Bolivia, Colombia, Peru, Venezuela, Trinidad and Tobago, Norway, United Kingdom, Algeria, Libya, Indonesia and others.

The oil and gas exploration and production activity is Repsol's main growth driver. Repsol has become a world leader in exploration, with over 40 finds since 2008. To guarantee this activity in the long term, in 2013, Repsol incorporated 65 exploration blocks, mainly in the United States (44 blocks) and Norway (6 blocks), into its mining holdings.

Production was doubled as a result of the acquisition of Talisman Energy in 2015. As of January 2022, Repsol produces an average of 572,000 barrels of oil per day, and it has proven reserves of 1.9 billion barrels.

Industrial

Refining

Industrial activity involves the supply and trading of crude and products, oil refining, petroleum product marketing, distribution and marketing of Liquefied Petroleum Gas (LPG), production and marketing of chemicals and the development of new energies.

The Repsol Group owns and operates five refineries in Spain (Cartagena, A Coruña, Bilbao, Puertollano and Tarragona), and one in Peru. The combined refining capacity exceeds one million barrels per day.

In addition to products derived from oil and gas, Repsol also produces aviation biofuel from waste and biomass.

The brands Repsol, CAMPSA and Petronor market their products through an extensive network of over 6,900 outlets, of which over 6,500 are service stations, distributed in Europe and Latin America.
Repsol is one of the leading retail distributions of LPG, bottled and bulk, worldwide and is the first in Spain and Latin America.

Chemicals
The Chemicals division produces and markets a wide variety of products in over 90 countries and it is one of the leaders of the market on the Iberian Peninsula. Its activities range from basic petrochemicals to derivatives.

Production is concentrated at three petrochemical complexes located in Spain (Puertollano and Tarragona) and Portugal (Sines), where there is a high level of integration between basic and derivatives, as well as with refining activities in the case of the Spanish facilities. Repsol also has a number of subsidiary and affiliate companies, through which the company produces polyolefin compounds, chemical specialties and synthetic rubber at special plants.

Trading
The main function of Trading is to optimize the supply and deliver to market of the Group’s positions in international markets for crude oil and petroleum products (integrated supply chain). Its activity consists of:
 the supply of crude oil and products for Refining systems and other Group needs, 
 the delivery to market of crude oil and associated products from its own production, 
 the maritime transport of crude oil and derivative products associated with these activities, 
 the management of crude oil and product hedges in the financial derivative markets.

Wholesale and gas trading
The Company’s activity in this area focuses on optimizing the margin from the marketing and sale of regasified LNG and natural gas. The optimization of the gas and LNG portfolio has been carried out through swap operations with third parties, along with logistic optimizations and trading in the gas system.

Commercial and renewables

Mobility

It provides marketing and sales of oil and other products at service stations and directly (Direct Sales).

At December 31, 2021, Repsol had 4,689 service stations in Spain, Portugal, Mexico and Peru.

Lubricants, Aviation, Asphalts and Specialized Products
Production and sale of lubricants, bases for lubricants, bitumen, jet fuel, extender oils, sulfur, paraffins and propellant gases.

LPG

Liquefied petroleum gas (LPG) is a viable alternative for making immediate progress toward decarbonization objectives.

In Spain and Portugal, Repsol distributes bottled LPG, bulk LPG and AutoGas. In Peru, it supplies AutoGas.

Retail Electricity and Gas
Repsol provides electricity and gas in the retail sector (residential and businesses) with a base of more than 1.3 million customers throughout all of Spain.

In 2021, Repsol secured the highest level of assurance —the A label— for the second straight year, for its environmentally friendly sourcing of electricity, according to the Comisión Nacional de los Mercados y la Competencia. Repsol is the only major retail marketer in Spain, in terms of customers supplied, that guarantees 100% renewable electricity.

Renewables and low-carbon generation
Repsol is a major player in the generation of electricity in Spain. As of 31 December 2021, the total installed capacity in operation of low-carbon and renewables reaches 3,738 MW. This includes 693 MW in hydroelectric and pumping plants, 1,625 MW in combined cycle plants, 600 MW in cogeneration plants, 430 MW in wind and 390 MW in solar photovoltaic.

Brief chronology
 1948 incorporation REPESA (Refinería de Petróleos de Escombreras S.A.) created for the installation of a refinery in the Valley of Escombreras, Cartagena (Spain).
 1981 Creation of INH: Public organization created to integrate the various companies operating in the oil and gas in which the Spanish state had a controlling interest or was the sole owner.
 1986 Creation of the Repsol group: Its sole shareholder is the INH. Repsol brings together the companies in which the Spanish state had a controlling interest in the areas of exploration and production (old Hispanoil), refining (formerly ENPETROL), chemical and liquefied natural gas (LNG), Butane (former Butano S.A.), CAMPSA and Petronor. Repsol Chemical (Alcudia), initially a subsidiary of Repsol Petroleum, which will then be a subsidiary.
 1989 The State (INH) began the privatization of Repsol. IPO of 26% of Repsol Capital. Repsol shares, S.A. upgraded trading on exchanges in Spain and New York.
 1991 Natural Gas Company is created.
 1997 The State completes the privatization of Repsol.
 On April 16, 2012 the President of Argentina, Cristina Fernandez de Kirchner announced the introduction in the Congress of a bill to "safeguard the sovereignty of Argentina hydrocarbons." This project has as main purpose the expropriation of 51% of the shares of YPF.
 On March 28, 2014 Repsol's Annual General Meeting ratified the "Convenio de Solución Amigable y Avenimiento de Expropiación" which recognises the Repsol's right to receive $5 billion as compensation for the expropriation of the 51% shareholding in YPF and YPF GAS, together with payment guarantees.
 On May 15, 2018 Repsol announced it would no longer seek growth for oil and gas.

Expropriation of YPF

In May 2012, the Argentine president Cristina Fernández de Kirchner, proposed the expropriation of 51% of Repsol's shares in YPF.  The Republic of Argentina's Yacimientos Petrolíferos Fiscales Act that was passed that summer made officially possible the expropriation of Repsol's shares. Repsol went to various international bodies to pursue legal action directly after losing its shares of YPF. The expropriation was an attempt by the Argentine government to nationalize its oil and gas production. Results however show that the move to nationalize actually hurt oil production in Argentina.  Compared to the oil production in 2011, YPF's oil production in 2012 fell by 8%, according to data from Argentina's Department of Energy.

Repsol had the backing of the EU and the US, and both powers condemned Argentina's move as expropriation. President Fernández claimed that the state would seize 51% of YPF. In June 2013, Repsol rejected a $5 billion proposal from Argentina to compensate for the 2012 expropriation. The proposal also would have given Repsol drilling rights to 6.4% of the massive Vaca Muerta shale-gas field. The board of Repsol unanimously rejected this offer, as it would have caused them to drop a $10.5 billion lawsuit that was in progress against the Argentine government. Repsol at the time owned 6.4% of YPF. On 25 February 2014, the Repsol board announced it had accepted a settlement offer from the Argentine government of an issue of Argentine bonds valued at $5 billion. The deal concluded after three months of negotiations in Buenos Aires was subject to shareholder approval. The agreement ended two years of legal wrangling and the potential for a long drawn-out legal battle. Repsol Chairman Antonio Brufau described the "friendly" settlement as "extremely positive."

Environmental record
In 2011 Repsol built the world's first service station certified by BREEAM, "the leading international method for evaluating and certifying building sustainability". The construction of the station was completed under green architecture parameters, utilizing multiple recycled materials.  The publication Newsweek selected Repsol as the most environmentally respectful energy company of 2012. However, recent reports of Repsol drilling in the indigenous lands of the Peruvian Amazon display a disregard for the environment. According to an Environmental Impact Assessment, Repsol's exploration of the rainforest will involve drilling at least 21 wells. Although Repsol denies it, 20 of the 21 wells fall within the land of indigenous people, who are very vulnerable to any sort of contact with foreigners.

In 2016, Repsol ranked as being among the 12th best of 92 oil, gas, and mining companies on indigenous rights in the Arctic. In 2021, Repsol was ranked no. 9 in the Arctic Environmental Responsibility Index (AERI) that covers 120 oil, gas, and mining companies involved in resource extraction north of the Arctic Circle.

Repsol's La Pampilla refinery in Peru was involved in an estimated 6,000-barrel spill off the coast of Lima, on 15 January 2022. Over 18,000 square kilometres of coastline have been affected, including the Ancón Reserved Zone, home to hundreds of endemic marine species. The spill has been called by the Peruvian Foreign Ministry "the worst ecological disaster that has happened in Lima". The Peruvian Minister for the Environment has estimated that the penalties imposed on Repsol could go as high as USD 33.4 million, aside from the reparations to the local population. Before the Government inspected the spill, Repsol falsely stated that the spill involved only "seven gallons". A Repsol spokeswoman stated to the Peruvian press that Repsol wasn't responsible for the spill: "we didn't cause the ecological disaster, we were unloading crude oil since the previous day. We called the Peruvian Navy, we asked them to confirm the alert on the coasts of Peru". The spokeswoman explained the mistake in informing the Government of the actual amount of spill stating that, since it happened during the night of the 15th, Repsol was unable to correctly estimate how much crude was spilled, and had to wait until the following morning to accurately analyse the situation. She also declined to say who would be responsible for the spill. The spill comes as the latest development in the botched response to the 2022 Hunga Tonga–Hunga Ha'apai eruption and tsunami in Peru, where, due to the absence of any formal warnings by the Peruvian Navy's Hydrography and Navigation Directorate, two people died. Repsol has claimed that the Navy's refusal to inform the public of the incoming waves and tsunami allowed them to continue with the unloading of crude oil, which lead to the spill.

On August 23, 2022, a judge in Peru admitted a lawsuit by Peru's Consumer Protection Agency, Indecopi, against Repsol, i.e. the case will be dealt with in court. The case would consist of a civil lawsuit seeking $3bn for environmental damage and $1.5bn for damages to locals, like fishermen.

Sponsorship

Repsol has been a longtime sponsor of motorsport. It partners with Honda Racing Corporation to compete in MotoGP under Repsol Honda Team since 1995, winning titles with legendary riders such as Mick Doohan, Àlex Crivillé, Valentino Rossi, Nicky Hayden, Casey Stoner, and Marc Márquez. Previously, it supported two-time world rally champion Carlos Sainz until 1997, Formula One teams Jordan Grand Prix in 1998, Arrows Grand Prix in 1999–2000 and Scuderia Toro Rosso from 2018, and the Mitsubishi Ralliart factory program at the Dakar Rally until 2009.

See also

 Repsol Honda

Notes

References

External links

r
Automotive fuel retailers
Companies based in the Community of Madrid
Natural gas companies of Spain
Oil companies of Spain
Oil and gas companies of Spain
Spanish brands
1986 establishments in Spain
Energy companies established in 1986
Multinational companies headquartered in Spain
IBEX 35
Companies listed on the Madrid Stock Exchange